"Sword and Stone" is a single released by the German hard rock band Bonfire.  It was recorded during the session recordings for their third studio album, Point Blank.  This song appeared in the Wes Craven movie, Shocker.  Included on the single are songs by Saraya and Voodoo X. "Sword and Stone" was written by Paul Stanley and Bruce Kulick of KISS together with producer Desmond Child and was originally a demo for the KISS album Crazy Nights.

Track listing

Band members
Claus Lessmann - lead vocals
Angel Schleifer - guitar
Joerg Deisinger - bass
Edgar Patrik - drums

Covers
Paul Dean (guitarist for Loverboy) released a version of the song in 1989, which appears on his solo album, Hard Core.

1989 singles
Songs written by Desmond Child
Songs written by Paul Stanley
Bonfire (band) songs
Kiss (band) songs
EMI Records singles
Song recordings produced by Desmond Child
Songs written for films
1989 songs